Walter Gustavo Silvani Ríos (born May 11, 1971, in Quilmes, Argentina) is a former Argentine footballer. He played for clubs in Argentina, Chile, Mexico, Spain, Uruguay and United Arab Emirates. He played as an attacker.

Teams
 River Plate 1989-1994
 Argentinos Juniors 1994
 River Plate 1995
 Universidad de Chile 1996
 Extremadura 1996-1997
 Salamanca 1997-2000
 UD Las Palmas 2000-2001
 Pachuca 2001-2002
 Al-Wasl 2003
 Newell's Old Boys 2003-2004
 Estudiantes de La Plata 2004-2005
 Liverpool (U) 2005-2006

Titles
 River Plate 1989–90, 1991, 1993 and 1994
 Pachuca 2001, CONCACAF Champion's Cup 2002

References
 

1971 births
Living people
Argentine footballers
Argentine expatriate footballers
Argentine expatriate sportspeople in Spain
Club Atlético River Plate footballers
Argentinos Juniors footballers
Newell's Old Boys footballers
Estudiantes de La Plata footballers
Liverpool F.C. (Montevideo) players
C.F. Pachuca players
Al-Wasl F.C. players
UD Salamanca players
UD Las Palmas players
CF Extremadura footballers
Universidad de Chile footballers
Argentine Primera División players
La Liga players
Liga MX players
Expatriate footballers in Chile
Expatriate footballers in Spain
Expatriate footballers in Mexico
Expatriate footballers in Uruguay
Argentine expatriate sportspeople in the United Arab Emirates
UAE Pro League players
Expatriate footballers in the United Arab Emirates
Association football forwards
People from Quilmes
Sportspeople from Buenos Aires Province